Managerial and Professional Officers (MPO) was a trade union representing senior staff working for local authorities in the United Kingdom.

The union originated as the Federation of Professional Officers' Associations, a loose body founded in 1975.  It brought together various small staff associations in order that they could more effectively take part in the Professional and Technical A Whitley Council negotiations on pay and conditions.  While most local authority staff were represented by the National and Local Government Officers' Association (NALGO), the federation believed that NALGO did not represent the interests of senior staff, and that because many such staff managed workers who were members of NALGO, a conflict of interest would arise unless the senior staff had separate representation.

In 1986, the associations which were members of the federation voted to unify as a single union, the Federation of Managerial and Professional Officers' Unions (FUMPO).  Nineteen small unions took part in the merger:

 Association of Education Officers
 Association of Local Authority Chief Architects
 Association of Local Government Lawyers
 Association of Local Government Personnel Officers
 Association of Local Government Supplies Officers
 Association of Official Architects
 Association of Passenger Transport Executives and Managers
 Association of Planning Officers
 Association of Public Service Professional Engineers
 Guild of Directors of Social Services
 Guild of Local Authority Valuers and Estate Surveyors
 Guild of Water Service Senior Officers
 National Association of Chief Environmental Health Officers
 National Association of Chief Housing Officers
 National Association of Chief Leisure Officers
 National Union of Local Authority Secretaries
 Society of Chief Trading Standards Officers
 Society of Metropolitan and County Chief Librarians
 Society of Public Analysts and Other Official Analysts

As all the associations were small organisations, the new union had a membership of only 7,770.  Union membership was opened to all local authority staff earning more than a specified salary, and also to senior managers in various public and private utilities, and people with some specific qualifications.

Three other small associations joined FUMPO later, including the Association of Scottish Local Government Directors of Personnel and the Greater London Council Senior Staff Guild in 1989, and by 1991 membership had reached 12,000.  The Whitley Council was succeeded by the Joint Negotiating Committee for Local Authorities' Chief Officers and Deputies, and FUMPO held a majority of trade union seats on this body.

In 1996, the union appointed a new general secretary, and under their leadership, the union renamed itself as "Managerial and Professional Officials", and affiliated to the Trades Union Congress (TUC) for the first time.  The union believed that TUC affiliation could reduce tricky competition with NALGO's successor, UNISON, and also access to the TUC's support and training.  However, the union did not affiliate to the Labour Party, perhaps because many senior local government staff did not support that party.

Despite a merger with the Society of Chief Officers of Probation early in 2000, MPO membership had fallen back to only 8,000, and later in the year the union merged into the GMB.

References

Defunct trade unions of the United Kingdom
1986 establishments in the United Kingdom
Municipal workers' trade unions
Trade unions established in 1986
Trade unions disestablished in 2000
GMB (trade union) amalgamations
Trade unions based in Hertfordshire